Carl Day (April 1875 in Frozen Creek, Kentucky – April 12, 1904 in Lexington, Kentucky) was an American politician who represented Breathitt, Lee, and Magoffin Counties in the Kentucky House of Representatives for three months in 1904, before dying in office. He is known for having introduced the Day Law, which mandated racial segregation in privately-owned educational institutions.

Day claimed to have been motivated by a November 1903 trip to Berea, Kentucky — home of Berea College, which was Kentucky's only racially-integrated educational institution — where he witnessed an interracial embrace between two female students.

Historian T. R. C. Hutton has noted that, although "various commentators [have] blamed" the Day law on "Carl Day's egregious personal racism or his personal vendetta towards Berea College," it may also — or instead — have been a ploy meant to increase the influence of Day's extended family in Breathitt County: "more a cynical political maneuver than a sincere attack on integration." Hutton has also pointed out that Day's only other bill was one which allowed timberland owners to deny right of way to adjoining lands, thereby making it impossible for smaller landowners to reach markets or bodies of water — a "final nail in the coffin for the (...) free-ranging mountain economy".

In March 1904, Day began experiencing symptoms of "inflammatory rheumatism", and was hospitalized; he died a month later, of pneumonia.

Early life
Prior to running for office, Day attended Central University of Kentucky, and served as Frozen Creek's postmaster.

Family
Day's brother was Walter Day, who served as Kentucky State Treasurer under William S. Taylor.

References

Members of the Kentucky House of Representatives
1875 births
1904 deaths
Eastern Kentucky University alumni
American segregationists
People from Breathitt County, Kentucky